Vyacheslav Levchuk (born 19 May 1971) is a Belarusian professional football coach and a former player.

Career
Levchuk spent his playing career in Gomel (Gomselmash), Dnepr Mogilev and MPKC Mozyr. In 1996 he won a double with MPKC.

After working as an assistant coach and scout for several clubs, he was appointed as Dnepr Mogilev manager in January 2018.

Honours
MPKC Mozyr
Belarusian Premier League champion: 1996
Belarusian Cup winner: 1995–96

References

External links 

1971 births
Living people
Soviet footballers
Belarusian footballers
Association football defenders
Belarusian expatriate sportspeople in Ukraine
FC Gomel players
FC Dnepr Mogilev players
FC Slavia Mozyr players
Belarusian football managers
FC Dnepr Mogilev managers
FC Sputnik Rechitsa managers